Goulou is one of the principal groups of Yue dialects. It is spoken around the Guangxi–Guangdong border, and includes the dialects of Yulin and Bobai.

Dialects
Yulin dialect is representative, though Bobai is better known. 
Yulin dialect
Bobai dialect
Guangning dialect
Huaiji dialect
Fengkai dialect
Deqing dialect
Yunan dialect
Shanglin dialect
Binyang dialect
Tengxian dialect

Phonology

Initials

Finals 

 Close vowel sounds may alternate between close vowel sounds  and near-close vowel sounds .

Tone 
Bobai dialect is widely cited as having the most tones of any variety of Chinese, though it actually only has six, the same as most Yue dialects. The reason for the claim is that Bobai makes a four-way tonal distinction in checked syllables, whereas most other Yue dialects have three. In Yulin dialect just to the north of Bobai, however, neither entering tone is split: there are just two entering tones, 7 and 8. Lee (1993) believes that Bobai is innovative in having split 8, whereas Yulin (along with several neighboring interior Yue dialects) is innovative in having merged a former split in 7: proto-Yue probably had 7a, 7b, and 8.

Many Yue varieties exhibit a "changed tone" with some semantic content.  Such tones occur in the Yulin dialect, in checked syllables only, marking diminutives.  In such cases, the final stop -p, -t or -k is changed to a homorganic nasal -m, -n or -ŋ, respectively, and the pitch contour is also altered.  This seems to be a trace of a now-lost suffix similar to ér (兒, Middle Chinese nye) in other Chinese varieties.

References

Citations

Sources 

 Gina Lee, 1993. Comparative, diachronic and experimental perspectives on the interaction between tone and the vowel in Standard Cantonese
Hashimoto, Anne Yue, 1971. A Guide to the Teng-xian Dialect. Princeton University, N.J. Chinese Linguistics Project.
 Ann Yue, 1979. The Teng-xian Dialect of Chinese: Its Phonology, Lexicon and Texts with Grammatical Notes. Computational Analysis of Asian and African Languages Monograph Series, No. 3.

Yue Chinese
Culture in Guangxi
zh:玉林話